Prabha Atre (born 13 September 1932) is an Indian classical vocalist from the Kirana gharana. She has been awarded all three of the Padma Awards by the Government of India.

Early life and education
Atre was born to Abasaheb and Indirabai Atre in Pune. As children, Atre and her sister, Usha, were interested in music, but neither of them planned to pursue music as a career. When Atre was eight, Indirabai was not keeping good health, and at a friend's suggestion that classical music lessons would help her feel better, she took a few lessons. Listening to those lessons inspired Atre to learn classical music.

Her music training was in the Guru-shishya tradition. She learnt classical music from Sureshbabu Mane and Hirabai Badodekar from the Kirana gharana. She acknowledges the influence of two other greats, Amir Khan for khyal and Bade Ghulam Ali Khan for thumri, on her gayaki. She also has formal training in Kathak dance style.

While studying music, Atre earned a Bachelor of Science from Fergusson College in Pune. Later she completed an LL.B. from University of Pune Law College. She has also studies at Gandharva Mahavidyalaya Mandal (Sangeet Alankar (Master of Music)), Trinity Laban Conservatoire of Music and Dance, London (Western Music Theory Grade-IV). She later also earned a PhD in music. Her doctoral thesis was titled Sargam, and pertained to the use of sol-fa notes (sargam) in Indian classical music.

Career
Atre had a short stint as a singing stage-actress in the early days of her career. She also played roles in a line-up of Marathi theatre classics, which included Sangeet Nataks like Sanshay-Kallol, Maanaapamaan, Saubhadra and Vidyaharan.

Atre is currently one of the senior vocalists in the country representing the Kirana Gharana. Her first LP, with Maru Bihag and Kalavati, clearly demonstrates the influence of Amir Khan. She has contributed to popularizing Indian classical vocal music at global level. She is competent in various musical genres such as Khyal, Thumri, Dadra, Ghazal, geet, Natyasangeet, and bhajans. She has been giving private lessons to students since 1969.

As a composer
 Book of compositions Swarangini and Swaranjanee
 She has also invented new Raags such as Apurva Kalyan, Darbari Kauns, Patdeep-Malhar, Shiv Kali, Tilang-bhairav, Ravi Bhairav, and Madhur-kauns
 Music compositions adapted to full-length dance programme 'Nritya Prabha' – choreographed by the Bharatanatyam danseuse Sucheta Bhide Chapekar.
 Music composition adapted for jazz by Susanne Abbuehl from the Netherlands.
 Music composed for musical-dramas and Sangeetikas.

Related activities
Atre has taught music, performing lecture-demonstrations, and writing on the topic of Indian classical music.
 A former Assistant Producer with the All India Radio.
 A' Grade — All India Radio Drama Artist (Marathi and Hindi).
 Main female role in Professional Musical Dramas.(Sangeet Natak and Sangeetika)
 She has been a visiting professor at a few institutions in the West, including the Rotterdam Conservatory in the Netherlands. Visiting professor at the Music conservatory – Montreux Switzerland, the University of California, Los Angeles, Indo-American Fellowship for studying research materials used in Ethnomusicology at the University of California, Los Angeles, and at the University of Calgary, Alberta, Canada.
 Appointment as 'Special Executive Magistrate' by the Government of Maharashtra in recognition of services to the cause of Music
 Professor and Head of the Dept. of Music, S.N.D.T. Woman's University, Mumbai.
 Around 1992, Atre started an annual Pandit Sureshbabu Mane and Hirabai Badodekar Sangeet Sammelan music festival. The festival takes place annually in December in Mumbai.
 Chief Music Producer and Director for 'Swarashree' Recording Company since 1981
 Member of the Advisory Panel of the Central Board of Film Censors, Mumbai 1984
 President 'Gaan Vardhan' – a well-known music organisation, Pune, for the past 22 years.
 'Dr. Prabha Atrre Foundation' was registered in May 2000.
 Atre established some years ago Swaramayee Gurukul in Pune. This institution amalgamates traditional guru-shishya style of teaching music and contemporary classroom teaching.
 Atre has been concluding Sawai Gandharva Bhimsen Festival since 2007 which is considered to be prestigious.
 Atre holds the world record to have released 11 books (from a single stage).  Released 11 books on music in Hindi and English at India Habitat Centre, New Delhi on 18 April 2016.

Awards
 1976 – Acharya Atre Award for music.
 Jagatguru Shankaracharya conferred the title "Gaan-Prabha"
 1990 – Padma Shri
 1991 – Sangeet Natak Academy Award
 Giants International Award, Rashtriya Kalidas samman
 Tagore Akademi Ratna Award announced from the Sangeet Natak Akademi in 2011
 Dinanath Mangeshkar award
 Hafiz Ali Khan Award
 Felicitation by Global Action Club International
 Govind-Lakshmi award
 Godavari Gaurav Puraskar
 Dagar Gharana Award
 Acharya Pandit Ram Narayan Foundation Award Mumbai
 Ustad Faiyyaz Ahmed Khan Memorial Award (Kirana Gharana)
 'Kala-Shree 2002'
 2002 – Padma Bhushan
 P.L. Deshpande Bahuroopi Sanman
 Sangeet Sadhana Ratna Award
 'Lifetime achievement' award by the Pune University
 Mahim Ratna Award by Shivsena Mumbai
 Felicitation by the Mayor of Mumbai, Name included in national and international biographical works.
 State government Award to her book Swarmayee.
 From the year 2011 "Swarayoginee Dr. Prabha Atre Rashtriya Shaastreeya Sangeet Puraskar" instituted by Tatyasaheb Natu Trust and Gaanvardhan Pune.
 Working as a committee member for several social, educational, cultural institutions.
 Chairman of Rasta Peth Education Society – a leading educational association in Pune for the last 12 years.
 2022 – Padma Vibhushan
 Newsmakers Achievers Awards 2022

Discography
 Maru Bihag, Kalavati, Khamaj thumri
 Niranjani – Puriya Kalyan, Shankara, Basant
 Anant Prabha – Lalit, Bhinna Shadja, Bhairavi thumri
 Bageshree, Khamaj thumri
 Jogkauns, Todi, thumri
 Malkauns, dadra
 Chandrakauns
 Madhukauns
 Madhuvanti, Desi
 Yaman, Bhairav
 Shyam Kalyan, Bihag, Rageshree thumri
 ghazal and bhajan recordings from live concerts from the 1970s

References

External links

 India's 50 Most Illustrious Women by Indra Gupta
 The Great Masters: Profiles in Hindustani Classical Vocal Music by Mohan Nadkarni

1932 births
Living people
20th-century Khyal singers
20th-century Indian women classical singers
Educators from Maharashtra
Hindustani singers
Indian music educators
Kirana gharana
Recipients of the Padma Bhushan in arts
Recipients of the Padma Shri in arts
Recipients of the Sangeet Natak Akademi Award
Singers from Pune
SNDT Women's University alumni
Women educators from Maharashtra
Women Hindustani musicians
Women musicians from Maharashtra
Women music educators
Recipients of the Padma Vibhushan in arts